Pholcipes is a monotypic genus of Comorain long-jawed orb-weavers containing the single species, Pholcipes bifurcochelis. It was first described by Günter E. W. Schmidt & R. H. Krause in 1993, and is found on Comoros.

See also
 List of Tetragnathidae species

References

Monotypic Araneomorphae genera
Spiders of Africa
Tetragnathidae